Kątki may refer to the following places in Poland:
Kątki, Lower Silesian Voivodeship (south-west Poland)
Kątki, Masovian Voivodeship (east-central Poland)
Kątki, Pomeranian Voivodeship (north Poland)
Kątki, Człuchów County in Pomeranian Voivodeship